Esther Manito is a female British-Lebanese comedian.

Early life 
Esther Manito was born to an English mother and Lebanese father in Saffron Walden, Essex. She studied for a BSc in Politics at London Metropolitan University, followed by a Masters in Communications.

Career 
Esther Manito began performing stand-up around 2016 following a six-week writing course at London's Camden Comedy School. She was the first female comedian to perform at Dubai Opera House, a regional finalist in 2017's Funny Women Awards, and was a finalist in the 2019 Arab British Center's Award for Culture.

She debuted at the Edinburgh Fringe with her show Crusade in 2019. Her second full length show, #notallmen, won Best Show at Leicester Comedy Festival 2021. She also performed #notallmen at the Edinburgh Fringe in 2022.  She debuted at Live at the Apollo in December 2021. She has appeared on podcasts including Evil Genius with Russell Kane, and Parenting Hell with Josh Widdicombe and Rob Beckett.

Personal life 
Esther Manito lives in Essex with her English husband, her father and her two children.

References 

Year of birth missing (living people)
Living people
British comedians
Alumni of London Metropolitan University